Benign metastasizing leiomyoma is a rare condition characterized by the growth of uterine leiomyoma in the other regions especially the lungs.

References

Gynaecological neoplasia
Benign neoplasms